Chris Newman (born February 17, 1940) is a sound mixer and director. His film credits include The Godfather, Amadeus, The Exorcist, The Silence of the Lambs, and The English Patient.

He has won three Academy Awards for Best Sound and was nominated for five more in the same category.

Newman resides in the U.S. state of New Jersey, and for several decades taught at the School of Visual Arts, New York City.

Selected filmography
Newman has won three Academy Awards and has been nominated for five more:

Won
 The Exorcist (1973)
 Amadeus (1984)
 The English Patient (1996)

Nominated
 The French Connection (1971)
 The Godfather (1972)
 Fame (1980)
 A Chorus Line (1985)
 The Silence of the Lambs (1991)

References

External links 
 
 Chris Newman Interview

1940 births
Living people
American audio engineers
Production sound mixers
School of Visual Arts faculty
Best Sound BAFTA Award winners
Best Sound Mixing Academy Award winners
American sound designers